The Cavan Under-21 Football Championship is an annual Gaelic Athletic Association club competition between Under-21 Cavan Gaelic football clubs. It was first competed for in 1975. Laragh United won the first Under-21 championship.

Top winners

Roll of honour

See also
 2013 Cavan Under-21 Football Championship

References

External links
 Cavan at ClubGAA
 Official Cavan GAA Website

Cavan GAA Football championships